Actor Benedict Cumberbatch has performed in many films, television series, theatre productions, and recorded lines for various radio programs, narrations and video games. He first performed for the New Shakespeare Company at Open Air Theatre, Regent's Park for two seasons. He later portrayed George Tesman in Richard Eyre's revival of Hedda Gabler (2005) and since then has starred in the Royal National Theatre productions After the Dance (2010) and Frankenstein (2011). In 2015, he played William Shakespeare's Hamlet at the Barbican Theatre.

His screen work includes television appearances in Heartbeat (2000), Silent Witness (2002) and Fortysomething (2003) before starring as Stephen Hawking in the television film Hawking (2004). He has played Sherlock Holmes in the crime drama series Sherlock since 2010. He has also starred in Tom Stoppard's adaptation of Parade's End (2012). He appeared in To Kill a King (2003) and he went on to appear in the films Atonement (2007) and Tinker Tailor Soldier Spy (2011). He has starred in the films Star Trek Into Darkness as Khan Noonien Singh (2013), 12 Years a Slave as William Prince Ford (2013), The Fifth Estate as Julian Assange (2013), and The Imitation Game as Alan Turing (2014). Through voice and motion capture, he played the characters of Smaug and The Necromancer in Peter Jackson's The Hobbit film series (2012-2014). He plays Dr. Stephen Strange in the Marvel Cinematic Universe (MCU), beginning with the release of Doctor Strange (2016) and reprised the role in Thor: Ragnarok (2017), Avengers: Infinity War (2018), Avengers: Endgame (2019), Spider-Man: No Way Home (2021), and Doctor Strange in the Multiverse of Madness (2022).

Benedict Cumberbatch has received various accolades throughout his career, including a British Academy Television Award, a Primetime Emmy Award, a Critics' Choice Television Award and a Laurence Olivier Award. He won the British Academy Television Award for Best Actor for playing the title role in the five-part drama miniseries Patrick Melrose. Cumberbatch won the Primetime Emmy Award for Outstanding Lead Actor for Sherlock and the Laurence Olivier Award for Best Actor for Frankenstein. His performances in the dramas The Imitation Game (2014) and The Power of the Dog (2021) earned him nominations for an Academy Award, a British Academy Film Award, a Screen Actors Guild Award, and a Golden Globe Award, all for Best Actor in a Leading Role.

Film

Television

Theatre

Radio

Narration

Video games

See also
 List of awards and nominations received by Benedict Cumberbatch

References

External links
 
 

Male actor filmographies
British filmographies